The British Olivetti Tournament was a women's professional golf tournament on the Ladies European Tour held in England. It was first played in 1983 in Liphook, East Hampshire and held annually until 1988, the last four installments in Sutton Coldfield, near Birmingham, West Midlands.

Winners

Source:

References

External links
Ladies European Tour

Former Ladies European Tour events
Golf tournaments in England
Defunct sports competitions in England
Recurring sporting events established in 1983
Recurring sporting events disestablished in 1988